

Films

References

2001 in LGBT history
LGBT
2001
2001-related lists